Radmilo (Cyrillic script: Радмило) is a masculine given name of Slavic origin. It may refer to:

Radmilo Armenulić (born 1940), tennis coach and former tennis player
Radmilo Ivančević, (born 1950), football manager and former footballer
Radmilo Mihajlović (born 1964), footballer

See also
Radmilovac
Radmilović
Radmilovići

Slavic masculine given names
Serbian masculine given names